The relations between Iran and Israel can be divided into four major phases: the ambivalent period from 1947 to 1953, the friendly period during the era of the Pahlavi dynasty from 1953 to 1979, the worsening period following the Iranian Revolution from 1979 to 1990, and the ongoing period of open hostility since the end of the Gulf War in 1991. In 1947, Iran was among 13 countries that voted against the United Nations Partition Plan for the British Mandate of Palestine. Two years later, Iran also voted against Israel's admission to the United Nations.

Nevertheless, Iran was the second Muslim-majority country to recognize Israel as a sovereign state after Turkey. After the 1953 coup d'état, which reinstalled the pro-Western leader Mohammad Reza Pahlavi as the Shah of Iran, relations between the two countries significantly improved.

After the 1979 Islamic Revolution, Iran severed all diplomatic and commercial ties with Israel, and its theocratic government does not recognize the legitimacy of Israel as a state. The turn from cold peace to open hostility began in the early 1990s, shortly after the collapse of the Soviet Union and the defeat of Iraq in the Gulf War, after which relative power in the Middle East shifted towards Iran and Israel. The conflict escalated in the early 1990s, as Yitzhak Rabin's government adopted a more aggressive posture on Iran. Rhetorical conflict heated up during the presidency of Mahmoud Ahmadinejad, who made inflammatory statements against Israel. Other factors that have contributed to the escalation of bilateral tensions include Iran's development of nuclear technology relative to Israel's long-stated Begin Doctrine, Iran's funding of Islamist groups such as Hezbollah, Palestinian Islamic Jihad and Hamas, as well as alleged involvement in terrorist attacks such as the 1992 attack on Israeli embassy in Buenos Aires and the 1994 AMIA bombing, and Israel's alleged support for militant groups such as the People's Mujahedin of Iran and Jundallah as well as alleged covert Israeli operations in Iran including multiple assassinations and bombings. Since 1985, Iran and Israel have been engaged in an ongoing proxy conflict that has greatly affected the geopolitics of the Middle East, and has included direct military confrontations between Iranian and Israeli organizations, such as in the 2006 Lebanon War.

Country comparison

Timeline of relations

Pre-modern background

The beginnings of Jewish history in Iran dates from late Biblical times. The biblical books of Isaiah, Daniel, Ezra, Nehemiah, Chronicles, and Esther contain references to the life and experiences of Jews in Persia. In the book of Ezra, the Persian king Cyrus the Great is credited with permitting and enabling the Jews to return to Jerusalem and rebuild their Temple; its reconstruction was carried out "according to the decree of Cyrus, and Darius, and Artaxerxes king of Persia" (Ezra 6:14). This is said to have taken place in the late sixth century BC, by which time there was a well-established and influential Jewish community in Persia. Persian Jews have lived in the territories of today's Iran for over 2,700 years, since the first Jewish diaspora when Shalmaneser V conquered the (Northern) Kingdom of Israel (722 BC) and sent the Israelites into captivity at Khorasan. In 586 BC, the Babylonians expelled large populations of Jews from Judea to the Babylonian captivity. Jews who migrated to ancient Persia mostly lived in their own communities.

The Jewish Bible's Ketuvim ends in Second Chronicles with the decree of Cyrus, which returned the exiles to the Promised Land from Babylon along with a commission to rebuild the temple.

'Thus saith Cyrus, king of Persia: All the kingdoms of the earth hath Yahweh, the God of heaven, given me; and He hath charged me to build Him a house in Jerusalem, which is in Judah. Whosoever there is among you of all His people—may Yahweh, his God, be with him—let him go there.' (2 Chronicles 36:23)

This edict is also fully reproduced in the Book of Ezra.

"In the first year of King Cyrus, Cyrus the king issued a decree: 'Concerning the house of God at Jerusalem, let the temple, the place where sacrifices are offered, be rebuilt and let its foundations be retained, its height being 60 cubits and its width 60 cubits; with three layers of huge stones and one layer of timbers. And let the cost be paid from the royal treasury. Also let the gold and silver utensils of the house of God, which Nebuchadnezzar took from the temple in Jerusalem and brought to Babylon, be returned and brought to their places in the temple in Jerusalem; and you shall put them in the house of God.' (Ezra 6:3–5)

As a result of Cyrus's policies, the Jews honored him as a dignified and righteous king. However, there is no evidence that the declaration reflected a unique attitude towards Jews. Rather, it may have been part of his renowned tolerance towards the cultures and religions of the people under his rule. The historical nature of this decree has been challenged. Professor Lester L Grabbe argues that there was no decree but that there was a policy that allowed exiles to return to their homelands and rebuild their temples. He also argues that the archaeology suggests that the return was a "trickle", taking place over perhaps decades, resulting in a maximum population of perhaps 30,000. Philip R. Davies called the authenticity of the decree "dubious", citing Grabbe and adding that J. Briend argued against "the authenticity of Ezra 1.1–4 is J. Briend, in a paper given at the Institut Catholique de Paris on 15 December 1993, who denies that it resembles the form of an official document but reflects rather biblical prophetic idiom."
Mary Joan Winn Leith believes that the decree in Ezra might be authentic and along with the Cylinder that Cyrus, like earlier rules, was through these decrees trying to gain support from those who might be strategically important, particularly those close to Egypt which he wished to conquer. He also wrote that "appeals to Marduk in the cylinder and to Yahweh in the biblical decree demonstrate the Persian tendency to co-opt local religious and political traditions in the interest of imperial control."

According to the Bible, Cyrus ordered rebuilding the Second Temple in the same place as the first; however, he died before it was completed. Darius the Great came to power in the Persian empire and ordered the completion of the temple. According to the Bible, the prophets Haggai and Zechariah urged this work. The temple was ready for consecration in the spring of 515 BCE, more than twenty years after the Jews' return to Jerusalem.

According to the Book of Esther, during the reign of Persian King Ahasuerus, generally identified as Xerxes the Great (son of Darius the Great) in 6th century BCE, the vizier Haman instigated a plot to kill all the Jews of ancient Persia. The plot was thwarted by Queen Esther who ordered the hanging of Haman and his ten sons. This event is celebrated as the holiday of Purim.

Israeli independence to Iranian revolution (1947–1979)
In 1947, Iran was one of the 11 members that formed the Special Committee on Palestine (UNSCOP) charged to investigate the cause of the conflict in Palestine Mandate, and, if possible, devise a solution. After much deliberation the committee presented a Partition Plan for Palestine, which had the support of 8 of the 11 members of UNSCOP. Iran along with India and Yugoslavia opposed the plan, predicting it would lead to an escalation of violence. Arguing that peace could only be established through a single federal state, Iran voted against the partition plan when it was adopted by the UN General Assembly. Shah Mohammad Reza Pahlavi predicted that the partition would lead to generations of fighting.

After the establishment of the State of Israel in May 1948, Israel and Iran maintained close ties. Iran was the second Muslim-majority country to recognize Israel as a sovereign state after Turkey. Israel viewed Iran as a natural ally as a non-Arab power on the edge of the Arab world, in accordance with David Ben Gurion's concept of an alliance of the periphery. Israel had a permanent delegation in Tehran which served as a de facto embassy, before Ambassadors were exchanged in the late 1970s.

After the Six-Day War, Iran supplied Israel with a significant portion of its oil needs and Iranian oil was shipped to European markets via the joint Israeli-Iranian Eilat-Ashkelon pipeline. Trade between the countries was brisk, with Israeli construction firms and engineers active in Iran. El Al, the Israeli national airline, operated direct flights between Tel Aviv and Tehran. Iranian-Israeli military links and projects were kept secret, but they are believed to have been wide-ranging, for example the joint military project Project Flower (1977–79), an Iranian-Israeli attempt to develop a new missile.

Debts
As at 1979, Israel owed about a billion dollars to Iran for business conducted before the Iranian revolution. Some of the debt arose from oil purchased by Israel, and a larger amount from the operation of the Trans-Israel oil pipeline and associated port facilities, which were a joint venture between Israeli companies and the National Iranian Oil Company. Israel decided against paying the debt at a meeting in 1979 and granted legal indemnity to Israeli companies which owed it. At least one Israeli bank account is known to hold $250 million owed to Iran.

Since the 1980s, Iran has been suing in the European courts for payment of the debts and has won several cases. However, payment of the debts is legally complicated by the international sanctions against Iran and by the fact that Israel classifies Iran as an enemy state. In May 2015, a Swiss court ordered the Eilat Ashkelon Pipeline Company to pay $1.1 billion to Iran, which Israel refuses to do.

Under Khomeini (1979–1989)
Following the Iranian Revolution and the fall of the Pahlavi dynasty in 1979, Iran adopted a sharp anti-Israel stance. Iran cut off all official relations with Israel; official statements, state institutes, and events. Iran ceased to accept Israeli passports, and the holders of Iranian passports were banned from travelling to "the occupied Palestine"’. The Israeli Embassy in Tehran was closed and handed over to the PLO. Ayatollah Khomeini declared Israel an "enemy of Islam" and the "Little Satan". The United States was called the "Great Satan" while the Soviet Union was called the "Lesser Satan".

According to Trita Parsi, Iran's strategic imperatives compelled the Khomeini government to maintain clandestine ties to Israel, while hope that the periphery doctrine could be resurrected motivated the Jewish State's assistance to Iran. However, at the same time, Iran provided support for Islamist-Shia Lebanese parties, helping to consolidate them into a single political and military organization, Hezbollah, and providing them the ideological indoctrination, military training and equipment to attack Israeli and American targets.

Israeli logistical support for Iran during the Iran–Iraq War (1980–1988) 

Israel sold Iran US$75 million worth of arms from stocks of Israel Military Industries, Israel Aircraft Industries and Israel Defense Forces stockpiles, in their Operation Seashell in 1981. Material included 150 M-40 antitank guns with 24,000 shells for each gun, spare parts for tank and aircraft engines, 106 mm, 130 mm, 203 mm and 175 mm shells and TOW missiles. This material was transported first by air by Argentine airline Transporte Aéreo Rioplatense and then by ship.  The same year Israel provided active military support against Iraq by destroying the Osirak nuclear reactor near Baghdad, which the Iranians themselves had previously targeted, but the doctrine established by the attack would increase potential conflict in future years.

Arms sales to Iran that totaled an estimated $500 million from 1981 to 1983 according to the Jafe Institute for Strategic Studies at Tel Aviv University. Most of it was paid for by Iranian oil delivered to Israel. "According to Ahmad Haidari, "an Iranian arms dealer working for the Khomeini government, roughly 80% of the weaponry bought by Tehran" immediately after the onset of the war originated in Israel.

According to Mark Phythian, the fact "that the Iranian air force could function at all" after Iraq's initial attack and "was able to undertake a number of sorties over Baghdad and strike at strategic installations" was "at least partly due to the decision of the Reagan administration to allow Israel to channel arms of US origin to Iran to prevent an easy and early Iraqi victory."

Despite all the speeches of Iranian leaders and the denunciation of Israel at Friday prayers, there were never less than around one hundred Israeli advisers and technicians in Iran at any time throughout the war, living in a carefully guarded and secluded camp just north of Tehran, where they remained even after the ceasefire.

Israeli sales also included spare parts for U.S.-made F-4 Phantom jets. Ariel Sharon believed it was important to "leave a small window open" to the possibility of good relations with Iran in the future.

Increasing tensions (1989–present)

Supreme Leader Ayatollah Ali Khamenei
In December 2000, Ayatollah Ali Khamenei called Israel a "cancerous tumour" that should be removed from the region. In 2005, he emphasized that "Palestine belongs to Palestinians, and the fate of Palestine should also be determined by the Palestinian people". In 2005 Khamenei clarified Iran's position after an international furor erupted over a remark attributed to President Ahmadinejad according to which Israel should be "wiped off the map" by saying that "the Islamic Republic has never threatened and will never threaten any country."

On 15 August 2012, during a meeting with veterans of the Iran–Iraq War, Khamenei said that he was confident that "the fake Zionist (regime) will disappear from the landscape of geography." In addition, on 19 August, Khamenei reiterated comments made by President Mahmoud Ahmadinejad, which members of the international community, including the United States, France, European Union foreign policy chief Catherine Ashton, and United Nations Secretary General Ban Ki-moon condemned, during which he called Israel a "cancerous tumour in the heart of the Islamic world" and said that its existence is responsible for many problems facing the Muslim world.

Rafsanjani presidency (1989–1997)

Khatami presidency (1997–2005)
Under reformist Iranian President Mohammad Khatami, elected in 1997, some believed Iran–Israel relations would improve. Khatami called Israel an "illegal state" and a "parasite," but also said in 1999 Jews would be "safe in Iran" and all religious minorities would be protected. A report indicates that Iran tried in 2003 to initiate a rapprochement with Israel by recognizing its existence in a proposal to the United States. The report claims that Iran's peace proposal with Israel was not accepted by the United States. In January 2004, Khatami spoke to an Israeli reporter who asked him on what grounds Iran would recognize Israel. This was believed to be the first time he had spoken publicly with an Israeli. At the funeral of Pope John Paul II in April 2005, Khatami was seated close to the Iranian-born Israeli President Moshe Katsav, who is from the same province, the Yazd Province, as Khatami. Katsav said that he shook Khatami's hand and the two had a brief conversation about Iran. However, Khatami denied this.

Ahmadinejad presidency (2005–2013)
The election of Mahmud Ahmedinijiad, a hardliner of Iranian politics, relations with Israel became increasingly strained as the countries engaged in a series of proxy conflicts and covert operations against each other.

During the 2006 Lebanon War, Iranian Revolutionary Guards (IRGC) were believed to have directly assisted Hezbollah fighters in their attacks on Israel. Multiple sources suggested that hundreds of IRGC operatives participated in firing rockets into Israel, and secured Hezbollah's long-range missiles. IRGC operatives were allegedly seen operating openly at Hezbollah outposts during the war. In addition, IRGC operatives were alleged to have supervised Hezbollah's attack on the INS Hanit with a C-802 anti-ship missile. The attack severely damaged the warship and killed four crewmen. It is alleged that between six and nine IRGC operatives were killed by the Israeli military during the war. According to the Israeli media their bodies were transferred to Syria and from there, flown to Tehran.

During and immediately after the Gaza War, the Israeli Air Force, with the assistance of Israeli commandos, was reported to have carried out three airstrikes in Sudan against Iranian arms being smuggled to Hamas through Sudan, as Iran launched an intensive effort to supply Hamas with weapons and ammunition. Israel hinted that it was behind the attacks. Two truck convoys were destroyed, and an arms-laden ship was sunk in the Red Sea. On 4 November 2009, Israel captured a ship in the eastern Mediterranean Sea and its cargo of hundreds of tons of weapons allegedly bound from Iran to Hezbollah.

In 2010, a wave of assassinations targeting Iranian nuclear scientists began. The assassinations were widely believed to be the work of Mossad, Israel's foreign intelligence service. According to Iran and global media sources, the methods used to kill the scientists is reminiscent of the way Mossad had previously assassinated targets. The assassinations were alleged to be an attempt to stop Iran's nuclear program, or to ensure that it cannot recover following a strike on Iranian nuclear facilities. In the first attack, particle physicist Masoud Alimohammadi was killed on 12 January 2010 when a booby-trapped motorcycle parked near his car exploded. On 12 October 2010, an explosion occurred at an IRGC military base near the city of Khorramabad, killing 18 soldiers. On 29 November 2010, two senior Iranian nuclear scientists, Majid Shahriari and Fereydoon Abbasi, were targeted by hitmen on motorcycles, who attached bombs to their cars and detonated them from a distance. Shahriari was killed, while Abbasi was severely wounded. On 23 July 2011, Darioush Rezaeinejad was shot dead in eastern Tehran. On 11 January 2012, Mostafa Ahmadi Roshan and his driver were killed by a bomb attached to their car from a motorcycle.

In June 2010, Stuxnet, an advanced computer worm, was discovered. It is believed that it had been developed by US and Israel to attack Iran's nuclear facilities. In a study conducted by Institute for Science and International Security it is estimated that Stuxnet might have damaged as many as 1,000 centrifuges (10% of all installed) in the Natanz enrichment plant. Other computer viruses and malware, including Duqu and Flame, were reportedly related to Stuxnet. Iran claims that its adversaries regularly engineer sales of faulty equipment and attacks by computer viruses to sabotage its nuclear program.

On 15 March 2011, Israel seized a ship from Syria bringing Iranian weapons to Gaza. In addition, the Mossad was also suspected of being responsible for an explosion that reportedly damaged the nuclear facility at Isfahan. Iran denied that any explosion had occurred, but The Times reported damage to the nuclear plant based on satellite images, and quoted Israeli intelligence sources as saying that the blast indeed targeted a nuclear site, and was "no accident". Hours after the blast took place, Hezbollah fired two rockets into northern Israel, causing property damage. The Israel Defense Forces reacted by firing four artillery shells at the area from where the launch originated. It was speculated that the attack was ordered by Iran and Syria as a warning to Israel. The Israeli attack was reported to have killed 7 people, including foreign nationals. Another 12 people were injured, of whom 7 later died in hospital. The Mossad was also suspected of being behind an explosion at a Revolutionary Guard missile base in November 2011. The blast killed 17 Revolutionary Guard operatives, including General Hassan Moqaddam, described as a key figure in Iran's missile program. Israeli journalist Ron Ben-Yishai wrote that several lower-ranked Iranian missile experts had probably been previously killed in several explosions at various sites.

In response to Israeli covert operations, Iranian agents reportedly began trying to hit Israeli and Jewish targets; potential targets were then placed on high alert. Yoram Cohen, the head of Shin Bet, claimed that three planned attacks in Turkey, Azerbaijan and Thailand were thwarted at the last minute. On 11 October 2011, the United States claimed to have foiled an alleged Iranian plot that included bombing the Israeli and Saudi embassies in Washington DC and Buenos Aires. On 13 February 2012, Israeli embassy staff in Georgia and India were targeted. In Georgia, a car bomb failed to explode near the embassy and was safely detonated by Georgian police. In India, the car bomb exploded, injuring four people. Amongst the wounded was the wife of an Israeli Defense Ministry employee. Israel accused Iran of being behind the attacks. The following day, three alleged Iranian agents were uncovered in Bangkok, Thailand, thought to have been planning to kill Israeli diplomatic officials, including the ambassador, by attaching bombs to embassy cars. The cell was uncovered when one of their bombs exploded. Police responded, and the Iranian agent present at the house threw an explosive device at officers that tore his legs off, and was subsequently taken into custody. A second suspect was arrested as he tried to catch a flight out of the country, and the third escaped to Malaysia, where he was arrested by Malaysian Federal Police. Thai police subsequently arrested two people suspected of involvement. Indian police arrested a Delhi-based journalist in connection with February's car bomb, which injured four Israelis including the wife of an Israeli diplomat. Syed Mohammed Kazmi the journalist was arrested on 6 March 2012, he is said to have been in contact with a suspect police believe might have stuck a magnetic bomb to the diplomat's car. It is said Kazmi was an Indian citizen who worked for an Iranian publication.

In late February 2012, WikiLeaks published confidential emails from Stratfor, a US-based private intelligence company, which were stolen by the hacking group Anonymous. Among the information released was a claim that Israeli commandos, in collaboration with Kurdish fighters, destroyed several underground Iranian facilities used for nuclear and defense research projects.

On 18 July 2012, a bus carrying Israeli tourists in Bulgaria was destroyed in a bombing attack that killed five Israeli tourists and the driver, and injured 32 people. Israeli Prime Minister Benjamin Netanyahu blamed Iran and Hezbollah for the attack. In July 2012, a senior Israeli defense official stated that since May 2011, more than 20 terrorist attacks planned by Iran and Hezbollah against Israeli targets worldwide had been foiled, including in South Africa, Azerbaijan, Kenya, Turkey, Thailand, Cyprus, Bulgaria, Nepal, and Nigeria, and that Iranian and Hezbollah operatives were incarcerated in jails throughout the world.

On 6 October 2012, Israeli airplanes shot down a small drone as it flew over northern Negev. Hezbollah confirmed it sent the drone and Nasrallah said in a televised speech that the drone's parts were manufactured in Iran. On 24 October 2012, Sudan claimed that Israel had bombed a munitions factory, allegedly belonging to Iran's Revolutionary Guard, south of Khartoum. In November 2012, Israel reported that an Iranian ship was being loaded with rockets to be exported to countries within range of Israel and that Israel "will attack and destroy any shipment of arms". In January 2013, the Fordo nuclear plant was hit by an explosion. Iranian officials suspected Mossad or CIA were responsible. On 25 April 2013, Israeli aircraft shot down a drone off the coast of Haifa, allegedly belonging to Hezbollah.

On 30 January 2013, Israeli aircraft allegedly struck a Syrian convoy transporting Iranian weapons to Hezbollah. Other sources stated the targeted site was a military research center in Jamraya responsible for developing biological and chemical weapons. Two additional air strikes reportedly took place on 3 and 5 May 2013. Both targeted long-ranged weapons sent from Iran to Hezbollah. According to anonymous US officials, Israel launched another airstrike or cruise missile attack on 5 July. It targeted Russian-made Yakhont anti-ship missiles near the city of Latakia, and killed several Syrian troops.

On 7 May 2013, residents of Tehran reported hearing three blasts in an area where Iran maintains its missile research and depots. Later, an Iranian website said the blasts occurred at a privately owned chemical factory.

Rouhani presidency (2013–2021)

In the Syrian Arab Republic
Several incidents have taken place on the Israeli–Syrian ceasefire line during the Syrian civil war, straining the Iran–Israel relations. The incidents are considered a spillover of the Quneitra Governorate clashes since 2012 and later incidents between Iran-supported Syrian Arab Army and the rebels, ongoing on the Syrian-controlled side of the Golan and the Golan Neutral Zone and the Hezbollah.

Since the onset of the Syrian War, the Israeli military is reportedly preparing itself for potential threats should there be a power vacuum in Syria. "After Assad and after establishing or strengthening their foothold in Syria they are going to move and deflect their effort and attack Israel," an Israeli official told The Associated Press in January 2014. Some experts say that while the encroaching militant forces on Israel's border will heighten security measures, the advancements are not likely to create significant changes to Israel's policy disengagement in the Syria crisis. IAF has been suspected of a number of airstrikes on Syrian soil, allegedly targeting Iranian and Hezbollah targets.
According to the Israeli military, since 2017 it has carried out over 400 airstrikes in Syria (and other areas in the Middle East) targeting Iran and its allies.

In Israel
A court in Jerusalem has sentenced an Israeli man, Yitzhak Bergel to four-and-a-half years in prison for offering to spy for Iran. Bergel belongs to the anti-Zionist Neturei Karta, an ultra-Orthodox Jewish sect which is vehemently opposed to the State of Israel's existence.

International incidents
On 5 March 2014, the Israeli navy intercepted the Klos-C cargo ship. Israel stated Iran was using the vessel to smuggle dozens of long-range rockets to Gaza, including Syrian-manufactured M-302 rockets. The operation, named Full Disclosure and carried out by Shayetet 13 special forces, took place in the Red Sea, 1,500 kilometers away from Israel and some 160 kilometers from Port Sudan.

In Iran

On 6 May 2014, it was reported that a blast shook the Iranian city of Qazvin. Los Angeles Times reported that the city might be home to a secret nuclear facility.

Iranian state media reported that on 24 August 2014, IRGC had shot down an Israeli drone near Natanz fuel enrichment plant. Israeli military did not comment on the reports.

Two workers were killed in an explosion that took place at a military explosives factory southeast of Tehran, near the suspected nuclear reactor in Parchin. In what was claimed by a Kuwaiti newspaper to be a response ordered by Iran, Hezbollah set off an explosive device on the border between Lebanon and the Israeli-controlled side of the Shebaa farms, wounding two Israeli soldiers. Israel responded with artillery fire toward two Hezbollah positions in southern Lebanon.

Raisi presidency (2021–present)

In Iran
In April 2022, President Ebrahim Raisi declared in the speech for military parade that "Iran's armed forces will target Israel's heart if it makes 'the slightest move'".

In May 2022, Colonel Sayad Khodayee was killed outside his home in Tehran by two gunmen on motorcycles. Iran blamed Israel for this. The spokeswoman of the Israeli prime minister refuse to "comment on the killing". But an unnamed intelligence official of Israel reported to NYT that Israel was responsible for the killing.

As NYT reported, Iran accused Israel of killing two Iranian scientists by "poisoning their food", according to an Iranian official who did not want to be named. The two scientists were Ayoub Entezari, an aeronautical engineer who worked for a military research center, and Kamran Aghamolaei, a geologist. Israeli media and Persian news channels abroad claimed that "Mr. Aghamolaei worked at Iran’s Natanz nuclear facility".

In the media

President Mahmoud Ahmadinejad

Former President Mahmoud Ahmadinejad, in office from August 2005 to August 2013, at the October 2005 "World Without Zionism" conference in Tehran adopted a sharp anti-Zionist stance. On 8 December 2005, during a summit of Muslim nations in Islam's holy city of Mecca, Ahmadinejad told Iran's Arabic channel Al-Alam a complicated story on the Holocaust and the establishment of Israel. Since then, the Iranian president has made statements pertaining to these topics.

Iran's Ambassador to the IAEA, Soltanieh
In April 2006, CNN correspondent Wolf Blitzer interviewed Ambassador Ali Asghar Soltanieh, Iran's Permanent Representative to the IAEA, who said, in regards to whether there should be a state of Israel, "I think I've already answered to you. If Israel is a synonym and will give the indication of Zionism mentality, no. But if you are going to conclude that we have said the people there have to be removed or we [said] they have to be massacred or so, this is fabricated, unfortunate selective approach to what the mentality and policy of Islamic Republic of Iran is."

Vice President Mashaei
In a speech at a tourism convention in Tehran in July 2008, Esfandiar Rahim Mashaei, Vice President and Head of Cultural Heritage Organization of Iran, proclaimed, "No nation in the world is our enemy, Iran is a friend of the nation in the United States and in Israel, and this is an honor. We view the American nation as one with the greatest nations of the world." He also added that Iran "wants no war with any country," insisting that Iran's actions during the Iran–Iraq War were purely defensive.

Hard-liners close to the government harshly attacked Mashaei's remarks. President Ahmadinejad, however, defended Mashaei and spoke in his favor. At a news conference, he said, "The Iranian nation never recognized Israel and will never ever recognize it. But we feel pity for those who have been deceived or smuggled into Israel to be oppressed citizens in Israel."

The issue prompted Iran's Supreme Leader Khamenei to "spell an end to the debates" on Israel. During a Friday sermon in Tehran, he stated, "It is incorrect, irrational, pointless and nonsensical to say that we are friends with the Israeli people... we are on a collision course with the occupiers of Palestine and the occupiers are the Zionist regime. This is the position of our regime, our revolution and our people."

Ayatollah Ahmad Khatami
In August 2012, a senior cleric and Tehran's provisional Friday Prayers Leader Ayatollah Ahmad Khatami, speaking about Qods Day, called for the annihilation of the "Zionist regime," emphasizing that the spread of the "Islamic Awakening" in the Middle East "heralds annihilation of the Zionist regime."

Brigadier General Gholamreza Jalali
In August 2012, Brigadier General Gholam Reza Jalali, who heads Iran's Passive Defense Organization, said ahead of Al-Quds Day that Israel must be destroyed, saying, "[Al-Quds Day] is a reflection of the fact that no other way exists apart from resolve and strength to completely eliminate the aggressive nature and to destroy Israel."  Jalali added that the Muslim world is required to support the "oppressed people of Palestine" against "the Zionist usurpers" and that the Islamic Revolution was a "beacon of light."  Jalali also said that the "Islamic front in Syria" had strengthened.

In response to these remarks, an Israeli government official said that these remarks were a "reaffirmation of what we continually hear from the Iranian leadership" and that Israel was taking the Iranian threat seriously.  The official said that the continual announcement of these remarks show how Iran's leaders believes in them, and that Iran's leadership must end these comments to reduce international pressure.

General Mohammad Ali Jafari
On 22 September 2012, General Mohammad Ali Jafari, the commander of the Iranian Revolutionary Guards, said that eventually a war with Israel would soon break out, during which Iran would eradicate Israel, which he referred to as a "cancerous tumour".

Cooperation

Business
After the overthrow of the Shah in 1979, most oil companies left Iran and the Iranian government had major difficulties selling oil in the international markets. In the meantime, Marc Rich, an Israeli-Swiss businessman with international ties, entered Iran through his Glencore company headquartered in Switzerland. Rich ignored US and international sanctions on Iran and became the major trader of Iranian oil for 15 years. He claimed that the oil he bought from Iran was shipped to Israel and both countries were aware of this transaction. Rich provided the Iranian government with weapons and missiles through the Iran–Iraq War. For his actions, United States government found him guilty of more than 65 counts of criminal offenses including money laundering and violating Iran sanctions. Rich was on FBI most wanted fugitives for many years, until President Bill Clinton pardoned him on the last day of his office in 2001. This pardon was very controversial and Clinton later regretted this act in his memoirs. There have been reports that former Mossad heads, Avner Azulay and Shabtai Shavit both personally wrote to Clinton arguing for Rich's pardon. Furthermore, Rich's first wife, Denise Rich (née Eisenberg) personally donated more than 1 million dollars to Clinton charities.

In 1998, the Seattle Times reported that pistachio makers in California were unhappy about the fact that Israel imported most of its pistachio from Iran. The head of Iran-China economic room, Asadollah Asgaroladi said in the article that such transactions are easily possible. Based on the article Israel imports only a quarter of pistachios from US and about half of its pistachios from Britain and Germany, whereas these two countries are not producers of pistachio at all and the source is very likely to be from Iran. Furthermore, in 1998 Israeli government punished the Hamama Brothers Co. for illegally importing 105 tonnes of pistachio from Iran. Israeli newspaper Ynet reported in 2007 that US government once again asked the Israeli government to stop importing pistachios from Iran. In 2008 US ambassador to Israel, Richard H. Jones wrote a letter to Israel's finance minister Ronnie Bar-on demanding Israel to stop importing Iranian pistachios from Turkey. Similar reports have been published by Haaretz.

In 1998, Israeli businessman Nahum Manbar was sentenced to 16 years in prison in Israel for doing business with Tehran, and in the course of the investigation, "hundreds of companies" were found to have illegal business dealings with Iran. The fall-out reached the United States as some transactions were alleged to have been part of the Iran–Contra affair. A controversy over Israeli-Iranian business links erupted in mid-2011. Israeli company Ofer Brothers Group was subject to U.S. sanctions after it was revealed that it sold ships to Iran via a third party, and that its ships also docked at Iranian ports. However US government cleared Ofer Brothers Group from the list three months later. In 2006 Israeli newspaper Haaretz reported the Israeli refinery Paz reportedly purchases crude oil coming from Iran. The article reported that the oil from Iran arrives to Israel through a port in Rotterdam. Another article in Haaretz in the same year reported that the Israeli energy minister Benjamin Ben Eliezer said: "Every attempted contact with an enemy state that serves Israeli business and economic interests, strengthens the stability of the region." And the Israeli foreign ministry said that it was not their business to look into the sources of oil.

Ynet reported that Israeli–Iranian trade, conducted covertly and illegally by dozens of Israeli companies, totals tens of millions of dollars a year. Much of this trade is conducted through a third country. Israel supplies Iran with fertilizer, irrigation pipes, hormones for milk production, seeds, and fruit; Iran, meanwhile, provides Israel with marble, cashews, and pistachios. Based on the same report in November 2000, the Iranian government asked an Israeli company, which built Tehran's sewage pipes 30 years earlier, to visit the country for renovations. Shortly afterwards, the assistant director-general of Iran's Ministry of Agriculture visited Israel secretly and stayed at the Tel Aviv Hilton Hotel. He expressed an interest in purchasing irrigation pipes, pesticides and fertilizers.

In April 2009 a large batch of oranges carrying stickers of an Israeli company were distributed in the Iranian market. Based on the investigations the oranges were imported from Dubai. In December 2011 Bloomberg reported that most of the filtering equipment currently in use in Iran were bought from an Israeli company called Allot Communications. The system called NetEnforcer allows the government to monitor any device that is connected to the internet. The devices were shipped to Denmark, where the original packaging was removed and replaced with fake labels. Al-Monitor reported in 2013 that the Iranian government asked Israeli experts to visit the earthquake stricken areas in the province of Sistan in 2006. Based on the report the Israeli experts spent the passover of 2006 in Iran.

Military relations

Pre-revolution
Israel was involved in the arming of Iran during the Pahlavi dynasty:
 Project "Flower" Tzur (see also Project Flower), a joint collaboration between Iran and Israel, aimed to develop a "state-of-the-art sea-to-sea missile, an advanced version of the U.S. Harpoon missile, with a range of 200 kilometers."
 Israeli Defense Minister General Ezer Weizmann and Iranian Vice Minister of War General Hassan Toufanian discussed the co-production of Israel's Jericho-2 missile, code named Project Flower.

Khomeini era

The Observer estimated that Israel's arms sales to Iran during the Iran–Iraq War totaled US$500 million annually, and Time reported that throughout 1981 and 1982, "the Israelis reportedly set up Swiss bank accounts to handle the financial end of the deals."

According to the report of the U.S. Congressional Committees Investigating the Iran–Contra affair issued in November 1987, "the sale of U.S. arms to Iran through Israel began in the summer of 1985, after receiving the approval of President Reagan." These sales included "2,008 TOW missiles and 235 parts kits for Hawk missiles had been sent to Iran via Israel." Further shipments of up to US$2 billion of American weapons from Israel to Iran consisting of 18 F-4 fighter-bombers, 46 Skyhawk fighter-bombers, and nearly 4,000 missiles were foiled by the U.S. Department of Justice, and "unverified reports alleged that Israel agreed to sell Iran Sidewinder air-to-air missiles, radar equipment, mortar and machinegun ammunition, field telephones, M-60 tank engines and artillery shells, and spare parts for C-130 transport planes." Israeli arms deals to Iran continued after the Iran–Iraq War, although sporadically and unofficially.

Disputed issues

Iranian funding of Hamas and Hezbollah

Iran provides political and financial support and weapons to Hamas, an organization committed to the destruction of Israel by Jihad. According to Mahmoud Abbas, President of the Palestinian National Authority, "Hamas is funded by Iran. It claims it is financed by donations, but the donations are nothing like what it receives from Iran."

Iran has also provided support to Hezbollah, another enemy of Israel, with substantial amounts of funding, training, weapons, explosives, political, diplomatic, and organizational aid while persuading Hezbollah to take an action against Israel. Hezbollah's 1985 manifesto listed its four main goals as "Israel's final departure from Lebanon as a prelude to its final obliteration" According to reports released in February 2010, Hezbollah received $400 million from Iran.

Nuclear program of Iran

Iran threatening Israel

The nuclear program of Iran with its potential to develop nuclear weapons, together with the anti-Israel rhetoric of the President, Mahmoud Ahmadinejad, and his desire for "the regime occupying Jerusalem" to "vanish from the pages of time," has led many Israelis to expect an eventual attack from Iran.

In May 2012, Iran's Military Chief of Staff declared: "The Iranian nation is standing for its cause and that is the full annihilation of Israel."

In August 2012, Brigadier General Gholam Reza Jalali, who heads Iran's Passive Defense Organization, said ahead of Al-Quds Day that Israel must be destroyed, saying, "[Al-Quds Day] is a reflection of the fact that no other way exists apart from resolve and strength to completely eliminate the aggressive nature and to destroy Israel."

In August 2012, a senior cleric and Tehran's provisional Friday Prayers Leader Ayatollah Ahmad Khatami, speaking about Qods Day, called for the annihilation of the "Zionist regime," emphasizing that the spread of the "Islamic Awakening" in the Middle East "heralds annihilation of the Zionist regime."

Iran's repeated threats against Israel, particularly in 2012, led Canada, a close ally of Israel, to close its embassy in Iran on 7 September 2012, and giving Iranian diplomats 5 days to leave Canada.

On 21 September 2012, at a military parade in Iran to mark the beginning of the Iran–Iraq War, and in which a new air defense system was unveiled, Amir Ali Hajizadeh, the Iranian air force chief, said that should a conflict between Iran and Israel break out, Israel would "manage the beginning of the war, but the response and end would be in our hands, in which case the Zionist entity would cease to exist. The number of missiles launched would be more than the Zionists could imagine."

On 22 September 2012, General Mohammad Ali Jafari, the commander of the Iranian Revolutionary Guards, said that eventually a war with Israel would break out, during which Iran would eradicate Israel, which he referred to as a "cancerous tumor."

On 23 September 2012, Hajizadeh threatened to attack Israel and trigger World War III, saying that "it is possible that we will make a pre-emptive attack" which would "turn into World War III." In the same statement, Hajizadeh threatened to attack American bases in the Middle East as well. Hajizadeh said that as a result of this attack, Israel would "sustain heavy damage and that will be a prelude to its obliteration." On the same day, Deputy Commander of the Iranian Revolutionary Guards Brigadier General Hossein Salami said that while Iran isn't concerned by Israeli "threats" to strike Iranian nuclear facilities, such an attack would be "a historic opportunity for the Islamic Revolution to wipe them off the world's geographic history."

On 2 October 2012, Hojjat al-Eslam Ali Shirazi, the representative of Supreme Leader Ayatollah Ali Khamenei to the Iranian Qods Force, alleged that Iran required only "24 hours and an excuse" in order to eradicate Israel. Shirazi alleged that Israel was "close to annihilation," and allegedly sought to attack Iran out of desperation.

Iran's actions, nuclear program, and threats have been viewed by Dr. Gregory Stanton, the founder and director of Genocide Watch, as having taken 6 out of 8 steps on the "path to genocide." Stanton urged the international community to take action against Iran and to isolate it, in order to "curb its genocidal intent." He said that "one of the best predictors of genocide is incitement to genocide ... and I believe that is exactly what Iran is doing today." Incitement to genocide is a crime under international law. He stressed that it is important not to dismiss "the early signs" as "diabolical rhetoric or as a tactic meant to advance a different goal," and doing so would "enable the perpetrators." Stanton also said that Iran has classified and symbolized Israel via hate speech and an ideology of exclusion, and has dehumanized Israel by portraying potential victim as "cancer" that should be wiped out. In addition, Stanton said that Iran has organized "fanatical militas," such as the Islamic Revolutionary Guard Corps, while stifling dissent in Iranian society.  He added that by denying a previous genocide, the Holocaust, by working on weapons of mass destruction, and through global terrorism, Iran has prepared for genocide.

In January 2013, Iran warned that any Israeli attack on Syria would be treated the same as an attack on Iran. After Israel attacked Syria, Iran simply stated that Israel would "regret this recent aggression".

In March 2015, the commander of the Basij militia of Iran's Revolutionary Guards said that "erasing Israel off the map is not negotiable."

Israel threatening Iran
In November 2003 a Scottish newspaper claimed that Israel "warned that it is prepared to take unilateral military action against Iran if the international community fails to stop any development of nuclear weapons at the country's atomic energy facilities." It cited then Israeli defence minister Shaul Mofaz stating, "under no circumstances would Israel be able to tolerate nuclear weapons in Iranian possession." In December 2005, a British newspaper claimed that the Israeli military had been ordered by then Israeli Prime Minister Ariel Sharon to plan for possible strikes on uranium enrichment sites in Iran in March 2006, based on Israeli intelligence estimates that Iran would be able to build nuclear weapons in two to four years. It was claimed that the special forces command was in the highest stage of readiness for an attack (state G) in December of the following year. Ariel Sharon reportedly said, "Israel – and not only Israel – cannot accept a nuclear Iran. We have the ability to deal with this and we're making all the necessary preparations to be ready for such a situation." Israeli military Chief of Staff, Dan Halutz, was quoted as responding to the question of how far Israel was ready to go to stop Iran's nuclear energy program with the statement "Two thousand kilometers." Seymour Hersh says U.S. Department of Defense civilians led by Douglas Feith have been working with Israeli planners and consultants to develop and refine potential nuclear, chemical-weapons, and missile targets inside Iran.

On 8 May 2006, then Israeli Vice Premier Shimon Peres said in an interview with Reuters that "the president of Iran should remember that Iran can also be wiped off the map," Army Radio reported. Peres, a Nobel Peace Prize laureate, drew unusually stiff criticism from an analyst on Israel's state television, Yoav Limor, for talking of destroying another country. In May 2006, IDF Chief of Staff Dan Halutz stated that Iran's nuclear facilities can be destroyed, hinting at a possible plan to do just that. In September 2007, Israel repeated its policy concerning the development of nuclear capacity by its potential enemies. Shabtai Shavit, a former chief of the Mossad, said Iranian atomic facilities could be destroyed within a year, but has not ruled out going that direction. Isaac Ben-Israel, a former general of the Israeli Air Force, said an attack could be carried out at any time but only as a last resort. Iran's Shahab-3 missile exercises were conducted in early July demonstrating that Israel was within reach.

According to the New York Times, Israel sought help from the United States for a military attack against Iran. Israel reportedly asked for bunker-busting bombs for an attack on Iran's main nuclear complex and for permission to fly over Iraq to reach Iran's major nuclear complex at Natanz. The Bush administration rejected the requests. According to the article, White House officials never conclusively determined whether Israel had decided to go ahead with the strike before the United States protested, or whether Prime Minister Ehud Olmert of Israel was trying to goad the White House into more decisive action before President Bush left office.

On 27 July 2009, Israel's Defence Minister Ehud Barak during a press conference with Robert Gates, the US Defense Secretary, in Jerusalem, warned Iran that a military strike on its nuclear facilities was still an option: "We clearly believe that no option should be removed from the table. This is our policy; we mean it. We recommend to others to take the same position, but we cannot dictate it to anyone." The same day, Israel's Ambassador to US, Gabriela Shalev, during a special UN Security Council session held to discuss the situation in the Middle East, called Iran the "biggest supporter of terrorism. The Islamic Republic's nuclear program and its support of terrorism pose a threat to the entire Middle East."

In 2010, Gabi Ashkenazi and Meir Dagan balked at Benjamin Netanyahu's preparations for a strike on Iran.

On 5 November 2012, Israel's Prime Minister Benjamin Netanyahu reiterated his willingness to mount a unilateral attack on Iran's nuclear facilities even without US support. This conflicts with experts' assessments that US support is needed in the form of the newer GBU-31 bunker busting bombs, which are required to penetrate some of Iran's reinforced nuclear facilities such as the Fordo site. Israel currently only has the GBU-28 bunker busting munitions, which are said to be insufficient. However, with the announcement by Netanyahu being made on the eve of the 2012 Presidential elections, tensions between the two allies are likely to rise.

In 2013, retiring defense minister Ehud Barak said that though it would be very difficult for Israel to operate alone, that Obama had ordered the Pentagon to prepare detailed plans for an American strike on Iran.

Netanyahu said in September 2013 that President Hassan Rouhani is trying to acquire a nuclear weapon, and that his perception as a moderate makes him a "wolf in sheep's clothing."

In January 2014, during a plenary session at the 9th World Economic Forum in Davos Switzerland, the President of Israel Shimon Peres said in response to a question about the threat of Iran's nuclear program that "Iran is not an enemy", and there are no historical hostilities between the two countries. In that regard he added: "I don't see a reason to spend so much money in the name of hatred".

In May 2018, it was revealed that Prime Minister Netanyahu had ordered the Mossad and military in 2011 to prepare for an attack on Iran within 15 days of receiving the order. According to Mossad chief Tamir Pardo, Netanyahu backed off after he and Chief of Staff Benny Gantz questioned Netanyahu's legal right to give such an order without Cabinet approval.

On May 29, 2022, Israeli Prime Minister warned that Iran will not go unpunished for inspiring assaults through its proxies.

On June 27, 2022, Israeli Defense Minister Benny Gantz indicated that Israel will cooperate with world powers to influence any agreement that might result from Iran's nuclear negotiations.

Speculations
On 26 May 2006, then Russian Defense Minister Sergei Ivanov reiterated Moscow's commitment to supply Iran with sophisticated anti-aircraft missiles. However Lockheed Martin Executive Vice President of F-35 Program Integration Tom Burbage indicated that once Israel has the F-35 it need not fear the S-300.

In June 2008, Israel conducted a major military exercise that American officials speculated might be training for a bombing attack on Iran. A senior Pentagon official said one of the goals of the exercise was to send a clear message to the United States and other countries that Israel was prepared to act militarily: "They wanted us to know, they wanted the Europeans to know, and they wanted the Iranians to know," the Pentagon official said. "There's a lot of signaling going on at different levels."

The Bush administration did agree to sell a thousand GBU-39 standoff bunker penetrating bombs to Israel, but a strike against Natanz would require hundreds of these bombs.

In a 2009 interview, American diplomat John Bolton argued that the Iran–Israel relationship had deteriorated to the point that it might be "wise" for Israel to preemptively attack Iran's nuclear research facilities. To destroy the facilities, while not a permanent solution to ending Iran's nuclear ambitions, he argued, might delay the progress of Iranian nuclear research for long enough that regime change could occur before the development of a nuclear weapon took place. He cited as an example the case of the apartheid government of South Africa, which renounced their efforts to pursue nuclear weapons after the Mandela government came to power.

In April 2009, Army General David Petraeus said "the Israeli government may ultimately see itself so threatened by the prospect of an Iranian nuclear weapon that it would take preemptive military action to derail or delay it." On 17 September 2009, Ze'ev Elkin said that the delivery by Russia of S-300 missiles may prompt Israel to strike Iran. However, in June 2010 Russia voted for UN sanctions to prevent the S-300 missile sale.

Iran consistently claimed that its nuclear program is purely for civilian purposes, and that it has no intention of ever utilizing its peaceful nuclear program to develop nuclear weapons. During the course of Iran's recent history, specifically during the Iran-Iraq war, Iran has experienced significant outages of its commercial electricity grid. Iran has also continuously claimed that it intends to ultimately export part of the electricity produced by its nuclear reactors to its regional neighbors, as a way of diversifying its mainly oil-based economy to more diversified revenue streams.

German Defense Minister Thomas de Maiziere said in 2012 that an Israeli attack would be unlikely to succeed.

Iran responding to Israeli threats
Iran's former foreign minister, Manouchehr Mottaki declared that Israel was not capable of an attack and still recovering from the 2006 war in Lebanon. The Iranian Chief of the Revolutionary Guards, Mohammad Ali Jafari said Israel was within the reach of Iranian missiles and Iran would close the Strait of Hormuz, cutting off two-fifths of the global oil supply. Iran has the capability to close the Strait of Hormuz or impede traffic for a month or more, and any U.S. attempts to reopen it could escalate the conflict.

According to Mohammad Ali Jafari "If Israel military aggresses against sovereignty and independence of the Islamic Republic of Iran, the country will use its right, established under international law which unequivocally establishes the right to defend its sovereignty by all lawful means available to it. Moreover, if such aggression is penetrated, the United Nations will be obliged to repulse such an aggression towards its sovereign member".

On 7 February 2010, Iran's supreme leader Ayatollah Ali Khamenei said the destruction of Israel was assured. According to the Tehran Times, Khamenei told Palestinian Islamic Jihad leader Ramadan Abdullah Shallah, "Israel is going downhill toward decline and fall and God willing its obliteration is certain". Khamenei went on to call Israel "a symbol of atrocity, viciousness, and ugliness," and said the West's "support for the Zionist regime is ineffective." Former Iranian President Ahmadinejad's chief of staff, Esfandiar Rahim Mashaei, said that if Israel attacked Iran it would be destroyed within a week.

On June 24, 2022, Iran claimed that Yair Lapid's allegations of an Iranian conspiracy to assassinate Israelis in Istanbul were "ridiculous" and intended to sour relations between Iran and Turkey.

On July 15, 2022,  the Iranian military cautioned Israel and the US not to use force against Iran, “The Americans and Zionists (Israel) know very well the price for using the word 'force against Iran," State media cited Brigadier General Abolfazl Shekarchi, spokesman for the Iranian armed forces.

See also

 Arab League–Iran relations
 2021 Natanz incident
 History of the Jews in Iran
 International Conference to Review the Global Vision of the Holocaust
 International Holocaust Cartoon Competition
 International recognition of Israel
 Iran–Israel proxy conflict
 Iranian Jews in Israel
 Israel–Saudi Arabia relations
 Persian Jews
 Tehran - Haifa - Tel Aviv
 Visa policy of Iran#Israel

References

Further reading

External links

 Iran and Israel at the United States Institute of Peace
 
 Iran at the Israel Ministry of Foreign Affairs

 
Israel
Bilateral relations of Israel
Jews and Judaism in Persia and Iran